ARCO Tower (currently known as 1055 West Seventh) is a high-rise office building located at 1055 West Seventh Street in Los Angeles, California. It has a prominent position in the local skyline, as it is across the 110 (Harbor) Freeway from the majority of the skyscrapers in downtown Los Angeles and the only other nearby building taller than it is 1100 Wilshire. The building has a floor area of 205,054m² and was designed by Gin Wong Associates. Construction of the building began in 1988 and was completed in 1989. The building was one of three ARCO Towers within blocks of each other in Los Angeles when constructed. It changed its name to 1055 West Seventh in 1998 due to ARCO relocating.

In 2013, Healthcare provider LA Care now has its headquarters in the building.

See also
List of tallest buildings in Los Angeles

References

ARCO
Skyscraper office buildings in Los Angeles
BP buildings and structures
Westlake, Los Angeles
Office buildings completed in 1989